Gail Armstrong may refer to:

 Gail Armstrong (politician), American politician in the New Mexico House of Representatives
 Gail Armstrong (illustrator) (born 1966), British illustrator